Álvaro de Bazán is the lead ship of the  of air defence frigates entering service with the Spanish Navy. She is named after Admiral Álvaro de Bazán.

Operational history

In late 2005, Álvaro de Bazán was deployed as part of the  aircraft carrier battle group in the Persian Gulf. This was the first deployment of a Spanish warship as part of an American naval battle group.

In early March 2007, Álvaro de Bazán became the first Spanish warship to visit Australia in 150 years. The ship was also visiting Australia as part of the first circumnavigation of the globe by a Spanish warship in 142 years.

References

External links

 BUQUESDEGUERRA.TK, a Spanish website about warships (Spanish)

Frigates
Frigates of the Spanish Navy
Ships built in Ferrol, Spain
2002 ships